Elenor "Sissy" Thurman (March 29, 1934 – October 2, 1968), is a  National Cowgirl Museum and Hall of Fame 1975 inductee. She was also inducted into the Texas Rodeo Cowboy Hall of Fame in 1978.

Life
Elenor Sissy Thurman was born Eleanor Marie Regini in Galveston, Texas, on March 29, 1934. Thurman was married to Doug Thurman until her death. Thurman started riding horses at age 5. She competed in her first barrel race at 11. Thurman was a rodeo queen at some nearby rodeo and stock shows. Prior to starting down the rodeo path, she was a tap dancer. She also taught tap dancing.

Career
In her time, she was one of the top-ranked and fastest barrel racers in the country. She set the fastest time in the National Finals Rodeo (NFR) and held that record for a time. She held barrel racing clinics. She held the position of barrel racing director in the Girl's Rodeo Association (the predecessor to the Women's Professional Rodeo Association). The GRA was founded in 1948. The foundation occurred one year after the first all-girls rodeo, which took place in Amarillo, Texas. She took advantage of her barrel racing experience while she was director to further develop opportunities for all who followed her footsteps.

Thurman first competed in the time when barrel racing was a 1940s-era "paid performance" of "Ranch Girl" event. But as her career evolved, the sport developed into true competition that established itself as a real rodeo event.
When she was 34-years-old, Thurman was a nine-time qualifier of the NFR and was ranked second in the World Standings. This was the same year that she was killed in an automobile accident.

Death
In 1968, Thurman accepted a ride from another rodeo family, last name Lewis. They were headed her way from a performance in Little Rock, Arkansas, to rodeo slack in Waco, Texas. On October 2, at 1:15 a.m, the Lewis vehicle slammed into an overturned 18-wheeler. The wreck killed Thurman, and some of the Lewis family, along with two barrel racing horses.

References 

1934 births
1968 deaths
Sportspeople from Galveston, Texas
American barrel racers
American female equestrians
Cowgirl Hall of Fame inductees
20th-century American women